The  (Masonic Funeral Music) in C minor, K. 477 (K. 479a), is an orchestral work composed by Wolfgang Amadeus Mozart in 1785 in his capacity as a member of the Freemasons.

History
Mozart's own entry into his catalogue under the heading "July 1785" may be an error; he most likely forgot to enter a new heading for November. It was performed during a Masonic funeral service held on 17 November 1785 in memory of two of Mozart's Masonic brethren, Duke Georg August of Mecklenburg-Strelitz and Count Franz Esterházy von Galántha, members of the Viennese aristocracy.

The work uses the Gregorian chant psalm-tone, . The work is scored for 2 oboes, 1 clarinet, 3 basset horns, 1 contrabassoon, 2 horns and strings. The basset horn parts were written for fellow Freemasons Anton David and Vincent Springer.

See also
Masonic music
Mozart and Freemasonry

References

Further reading
 Konrad, Ulrich (2020). Fragen zur Maurerischen Trauermusik KV 477, Mozart Studien, 27, p. 155–176

External links

, Vienna Philharmonic, Herbert von Karajan

Masonic compositions by Wolfgang Amadeus Mozart
Funerary and memorial compositions
1785 compositions
Compositions in C minor